During the 1997–98 English football season, Bury F.C. competed in the Football League First Division.

Season summary
In the 1997–98 season, newly promoted Bury were battling against relegation for most of the campaign and were destined to be heading straight back down by the beginning of February where they sat in the bottom three with only 4 wins from 30 games, but from then on Bury went on an amazing nine game unbeaten run and winning 7 in their final 16 league games to secure survival against the odds.

Final league table

Results
Bury's score comes first

Legend

Football League First Division

FA Cup

League Cup

Squad

References

Bury F.C. seasons
Bury